Bogdanki may refer to the following places:
Bogdanki, Greater Poland Voivodeship (west-central Poland)
Bogdanki, Kuyavian-Pomeranian Voivodeship (north-central Poland)
Bogdanki, Podlaskie Voivodeship (north-east Poland)